Auezov District is an administrative subdivision of the city of Almaty. It was established on 10 March 1972.

History
Auezov district was formed on March 10, 1972 by Decree of the Presidium of the Supreme Soviet of the Kazakh SSR as a result of the disbandment of Leninsky and Kalininsky districts. It is named after the Soviet Kazakh scientist, writer and playwright Mukhtar Auezov.

Akim
 Shatov, Evgeny Ivanovich (1994 — 1997)
 Ustyugov, Vladimir Nikolaevich (1997 — 2006)
 Nesipbayev, Adil Sagimbekovich (17.07.2006 — 2009)
 Torgaev, Bekkali Nurgalievich (13.08.2009 — 02.2015)
 Rakhimbetov, Altai Ergazinovich (20.02.2015 — 26.09.2018)
 Uskenbayev, Anuar Auezovich (26.09.2018 — 26.08.2019)
 Sayfedenov, Sairan Tapenovich (28.08.2019)

References 

 

Districts of Almaty